Colón, known as Ciudad Colón is a district and the head city of the Mora canton, in the San José province of Costa Rica. It is famous for its warm climate, proximity to nature and its surrounding mountains, folkloric traditions, horse riding, and multiculturalism.

Toponymy 
Named after Christopher Columbus, Ciudad Colón used to be called Villa Colón, and before that it was called Pacaca, which was the name of the chief of a local tribe.

Geography 
Colón has an area of  km² and an elevation of  metres.

Demographics 

For the 2011 census, Colón had a population of  inhabitants. 

Colón can be considered as cosmopolitan as Santa Ana or Escazu, but in terms of amenities and services available, it is considered a typical small Costa Rican town. The cost of living is lower than in Santa Ana or Escazu. There are two major supermarkets that meet the needs and requirements of expatriates and dozens of other small stores, banks and pharmacies. There are no upscale bars or restaurants but there are many local venues catering to food and entertainment. Ciudad Colón is particularly suitable for outdoor activities such as horse riding, mountainboarding, 
biking, running and hiking.

Locations
Located some 6 km out into the hills is the United Nations University for Peace (UPEACE). People from over 60 nationalities live in Ciudad Colon at any given time, making it one of the most multi-cultural towns of its size in the world. Most of this expatriate population consists of students and faculty members from the university.

Close to the town is Quitirrisí, an indigenous reserve in the Central Valley known for the residents' handcraft abilities.

Transportation

Road transportation 
The district is covered by the following road routes:
 National Route 22
 National Route 121
 National Route 136
 National Route 239

References 

Districts of San José Province
Populated places in San José Province